Estadio de São Luís is a multi-use stadium in Faro, Portugal. It is used mostly for football matches and hosts the home matches of S.C. Farense. The stadium was able to hold 12,000 people and opened in 1922. Current capacity 6,904 seats. It was used continuously by Farense between 1924, when it became the main tenant of the stadium, and 2004, when the club moved to the newly built Algarve Stadium. Farense has been playing back at the renovated São Luís since 2013.

Portugal national football team
The following national team matches were held in the stadium.

References

S.C. Farense
Sports venues completed in 1924
Football venues in Portugal